Mit meinen heißen Tränen ("with my hot tears") is a West German-Austrian-Swiss joint production film which depicts the final years of the life of 19th century Austrian composer Franz Schubert. It was released on 31 October 1986 in Germany, Austria and Netherlands. The film's lead actor Udo Samel was nominated for 1986 European Film Award for Best Actor.

Cast
 Udo Samel as Franz Schubert
 Daniel Olbrychski as Franz von Schober
 Wojciech Pszoniak as Kajetan
 Traugott Buhre as Schuberts Vater
 Maja Komorowska as Anna Schubert
 Gabriel Barylli as Moritz von Schwind
 Florentin Groll as Joseph von Spaun
 Vitus Zeplichal as Josef Hüttenbrenner
 Wolf-Dietrich Sprenger as Johann Mayrhofer
 Therese Affolter as Magdalena
 Erni Mangold as Gräfin Rieder
 Dorothea Neff as Die alte Gräfin
 Christian Altenburger as Johann Strauss
 Michaela Widhalm as Schuberts Halbschwester Josefa
 Monica Bleibtreu as Ferdinand Schuberts Frau
 Despina Pajanou as Frau von gegenüber
 Jessica Kosmalla as Hure
 Charlotte Acklin as Bettina
 Dagmar Schwarz as Johanna
 Sylvia Haider as Maria
 Annette Uhlen as Lisette
 Huberta Haubmann as Kathinka

Awards and nominations 
Udo Samel nominated for European Film Award for Best Actor, 1986

References

External links 
 
 Mit meinen heißen Tränen bei filmportal.de

1986 films
1986 television films
Austrian drama films
Swiss drama films
West German films
Austrian television miniseries
Swiss television miniseries
1980s German television miniseries
1980s German-language films
German-language television shows
1980s Austrian television series
1980s Swiss television series
1986 German television series debuts
1986 German television series endings
1986 Austrian television series endings
1986 Swiss television series debuts
Films set in the 1810s
Films set in the 1820s
Television series set in the 1810s
Television series set in the 1820s
Films set in Vienna
Films about classical music and musicians
Films about composers
Television shows set in Austria
ZDF original programming
ORF (broadcaster)
Cultural depictions of Franz Schubert
Grimme-Preis for fiction winners